Mohammad  Abdullah (born 1 January 1937) is a Bangladeshi politician and academic. After teaching in higher education for over a decade, he served three terms as a member of parliament for constituency Chandpur-4, as a nominee of the Bangladesh Nationalist Party from 1991 to 2001. He later resigned from the Bangladesh Nationalist party and joined the Liberal Democratic Party led by Col. (Retd.) Oli Ahmed.

Early life
Abdullah was born into a distinguished Muslim family in Chandpur District, now a part of the Chittagong Division. His father, Alhaj Nawab Ali (Gazi), was a scholar in Arabic, philanthropist and Islamic thinker, a Muslim aristocrat belonging to the "Gazi" family (their ancestors assumed the title "Gazi" for their gallantry in defending Islam and success in extending the realms of Islam).He is a relative of Haji Shariatullah,the founder of the Faraizi movement.

Abdullah attended Bajapti Ramani Mohan High School, where he passed the Matriculation in 1953. He moved to Dhaka for his higher education and started living there permanently with his two brothers, passing I.Com (Intermediate) at Jagannath College in 1955 and obtaining B.Com. (Hons.) and M.Com. degrees from the University of Dhaka in 1958 and 1959 respectively. Subsequently, he went to London for higher studies and studied to qualify as a Chartered Secretary; he earned his certificate from the Chartered Institute of Secretaries in England and became a Fellow (F.C.I.S).

Academic career
Before entering politics, Abdullah was an educator. He taught in degree colleges and served as a part-time faculty member in the Departments of Management and Finance at the University of Dhaka for nearly 14 years; he also taught in a secondary modern school in the U.K. from 1964 to 1966 while studying there. He was a member of the Senate of Chittagong University from 1991 to 1995. He served as the acting chairman of Manarat International University.

Political career
In 1991 Abdullah entered politics by joining the Bangladesh Nationalist Party and in the Bangladesh General Election that year he was elected a Member of Parliament from the constituency 263, Chandpur-4, defeating Mizanur Rahman Chowdhury, who had served as Prime Minister under President Ershad. He was elected three times from Chandpur-4 with BNP nomination (in the 5th, the 6th and the 7th parliamentary elections). The BNP also declared him their candidate for 2001 but in a surprise turnabout his nomination was cancelled and S.A. Sultan (thereafter elected as the M.P.) was given the nomination. At that point Abdullah resigned from the party. He ran as an independent.

After keeping himself away from politics for some years he joined the Liberal Democratic Party. In 2006 the Awami League-led mega-alliance told the Liberal Democratic Party to run for 29 parliamentary seats. Abdullah was the nominee for Chandpur-4. In June 2019 Abdullah resigned from the Liberal Democratic Party led by Col. (Retd.) Oli Ahmed and issued a statement to the press confirming his resignation.

Publications 
In 1962 Abdullah was the author of Essential On Banking.

References

External links

1937 births
Living people
People from Chandpur District
Bangladesh Nationalist Party politicians
University of Dhaka alumni
Liberal Democratic Party (Bangladesh) politicians